Roger Everett Summons  (born 11 June 1946) is the Schlumberger Professor of Geobiology at the Massachusetts Institute of Technology and Professor of Geobiology in the Department of Earth, Atmospheric and Planetary Sciences.

Summons’ research spans biogeochemistry, geobiology, and astrobiology. His work employs organic geochemical methods to examine the lipid chemistry of modern and ancient microbes, the isotopic signatures of climate change, and the evolution and origins of life.

Summons was elected a member of the National Academy of Sciences in 2020.

Education and early life
Roger Summons was born on 11 June 1946 in Sydney, Australia, and attended Lithgow High School. He earned his B.Sc. (Honours Class I) in 1968 and Ph.D. in 1971 in organic chemistry from the Wollongong University College of the University of New South Wales. This institution is now the University of Wollongong. Summons' doctoral supervisors were professors Emery Gellert and J. Ellis. Following graduation, Summons completed a two-year fellowship in the Genetics Department, Stanford University from 1972 to 1973 before starting postdoctoral and research fellowships in the Research School of Chemistry at the Australian National University. At Stanford, Summons worked under the direction of Alan Duffield and Joshua Lederberg.

Research and career
Before joining MIT as a professor of geobiology in 2001, he held appointments at the Australian National University’s Research School of Biological Sciences from 1977 to 1983, and at Geoscience Australia, Canberra from 1983 to 2001, where he led a research team that focused on the characterization of the biogeochemical carbon cycle and the nature and habitat of Australian petroleum.

Summons is particularly known for the application of organic geochemical techniques to sediments of Precambrian age and modern microbes in order to increase the understanding of the early evolution of life on Earth. Summons is a member of the editorial boards of the peer-reviewed scientific journals Astrobiology, Geobiology, and Palaeoworld since their inception. He also served as associate editor of the peer-reviewed scientific journal Geochimica et Cosmochimica Acta from 1995 to 2006.

From 2003 to 2007, Summons served on three committees of the US National Research Council including the Committee on Origin and Evolution of Life, the Committee on Limits of Life, and the Committee on Mars Astrobiology. Summons served as NASA co-chair of the organic contamination panel for the Mars 2020 Rover, and was a member of the NASA Astrobiology Institute Executive Council from 2008 to 2017. During that time, he led the Foundations of Complex Life, the MIT NASA Astrobiology Institute team which interrogated the environmental, ecological, and genetic factors that lead to the evolution of complex life.

In addition to actively teaching both graduate and undergraduate courses at MIT, Summons is engaged as a collaborator with the search for organics on Mars as a member of the SAM Team of NASA's Mars Science Laboratory mission. He is also an investigator in the Simons Collaboration on the Origins of Life (SCOL).

Selected papers 

Molecular biosignatures: generic qualities of organic compounds that betray biological origins
Ancient biomolecules: their origin, fossilization and significance in revealing the history of life
Assessing the distribution of sedimentary C40 carotenoids through time
Rapid oxidation of Earth's atmosphere 2.33 billion years ago
Paleoproterozoic sterol biosynthesis and the rise of oxygen
The ‘Dirty Ice’ of the McMurdo Ice Shelf: Analogues for biological oases during the Cryogenian
Organic matter preserved in 3-billion-year-old mudstones at Gale crater 
Steroids, triterpenoids and molecular oxygen
2-Methylhopanoids as biomarkers for cyanobacterial oxygenic photosynthesis
Chlorobiaceae in Palaeozoic seas - Combined evidence from biological markers, isotopes and geology

Honors and awards

1987 – 1998 - Fellow, Royal Australian Chemical Institute
1998 - Fellow, Australian Academy of Science
2002 - Australian Organic Geochemistry Medal
2003 - Alfred E. Treibs Award of the Geochemical Society
2005 - Halpern Medal, University of Wollongong
2006 - Fellow, American Geophysical Union
2008 - Alexander von Humboldt Foundation Research Award
2008 - Fellow, Royal Society
2008 - Moore Distinguished Scholar, Division of Geological and Planetary Sciences, California Institute of Technology
2009 - Doctor of Science, Honoris Causa, University of Wollongong
2012 - Fellow, American Academy of Microbiology
2013 - Honorary Fellow, Hanse-Wissenschaftskolleg (Institute for Advanced Study)
2014 - Inaugural Fellow, Australian and New Zealand Society for Mass Spectrometry
2015 - Cox visiting professor, School of Earth, Energy and Environmental Sciences, Stanford University (through 2016) 
2020 - Fellow, National Academy of Sciences (NAS)

References

External links

Living people
University of Wollongong alumni
Fellows of the American Geophysical Union
Fellows of the Australian Academy of Science
Members of the United States National Academy of Sciences
1946 births
Planetary scientists
Biogeochemists
Astrobiologists